Mary O'Sullivan may refer to:
 Mary Kenney O'Sullivan, organizer in the early U.S. labor movement
 Mary Blanche O'Sullivan, Canadian teacher, writer, and editor
 Mary Josephine Donovan O'Sullivan, professor of history
 Mary Rhys-Jones (née O'Sullivan), British charity worker and secretary, mother of Sophie, Countess of Wessex
 Mary O'Sullivan (camogie), Irish camogie-player